GASCD, an initialism standing for Governments Accountable to Society & Citizens = Democracy, is a compilation album put together in May 2001 by songwriter and activist Chris Brown and released in 2002.  A double album inspired by the activist protests at the Quebec City Summit of the Americas, GASCD collects political songs and spoken word segments by both Canadian and international musicians and activists.  The album's profits are distributed to progressive media and social justice groups.

Track listing

Disc one
 Sylvain Lamoureux, "The Geese" – 1:06
 Ani DiFranco, "Your Next Bold Move" – 5:47
 Rheostatics, "Bad Time to Be Poor" – 4:53
 Olu Dara, "Red Ant (Nature)" – 4:07
 Gordon Downie, "Trick Rider" – 4:24
 Jello Biafra, Spoken word excerpt from Mohawk College April 25, 2001 – 2:53
 Sex Mob, "Black and Tan Fantasy" – 4:14
 Bruce Cockburn, "Call it Democracy" – 3:49
 Scotty Hard, "Diurnal" – 5:24
 Propagandhi, "Today's Empire, Tomorrow's Ashes" – 2:35
 Maude Barlow, Spoken word excerpt from People's Summit, Quebec City, 2001 – 1:13
 Chris Brown and Kate Fenner, "How You Gonna Bring Your Children to God" – 4:57
 Tony Scherr, "Food for News" – 3:41
 Michael Franti, "Oh My God" – 5:11
 Interférence Sardines, "Un Nescalier" – 5:57

Disc two
 Gil Scott-Heron, "Work For Peace" – 7:29
 Nikki Giovanni, "Nothing Makes Sense" – 2:34
 Clark Gayton, "Glad I Found My Religion" – 3:02
 David Suzuki, Phone interview excerpt, May 2001 – 2:26
 The Tragically Hip, "Putting Down" – 3:08
 Sarah Harmer, "1st Lady" – 4:01
 Christian Doscher, "Straight Lines" – 4:16
 DJ Serious, "Trap Doors" – 3:48
 Barenaked Ladies, "Sell, Sell, Sell" – 4:00
 Andrew Whiteman, "Thot Provoker" – 4:38
 Bionic, "A Political Song for Danko Jones to Sing" – 5:09
 The Dinner Is Ruined, "Funk Asylum" – 4:17
 Free Radicals, "Bombs Burst Brightly on the Lawn" – 5:04
 Jason Collett, "Bitter Beauty" – 4:01
 Chris Brown, "The Shot Across the Bow" – 3:37
 David Suzuki, Phone interview excerpt, May 2001 – 3:32
 Bill Frisell, "What's Going On" – 9:46

Compilation albums by Canadian artists
Charity albums
2002 compilation albums